For the Term of His Natural Life is a 1983 Australian three-part, six-hour television miniseries based on the classic 1874 novel of the same name by Marcus Clarke. Each episode aired for two hours on Nine Network on 23 May, 30 May and 6 June 1983.

Plot
Well-educated but adventurous young British aristocrat, Richard Devine, son of Sir Richard Devine, learns his mother's secret - his biological father is in fact Lord Bellasis. To protect his mother's reputation, he leaves home to take ship to India, but is arrested after Lord Bellasis is murdered. He is tried for murder and acquitted but found guilty of theft of a pocket-watch which was given him by Lord Bellasis. Under the alias of Rufus Dawes, he is sentenced to transportation for life.

Dawes is shipped to Van Diemen's Land on the Malabar, which also carries Captain Vickers, who is to become the new commandant of the penal settlement at Macquarie Harbour, his wife Julia and child Sylvia, Julia's maid, Sarah Purfoy and Lieutenant Maurice Frere, During the voyage, Dawes starts to tutor an illiterate young convict boy, known as ‘Blinker’, in the basics of arithmetic.

Life is brutal for the convicts. Vickers tries to be relatively humane but Frere goes out of his way to be as brutal as possible. Because of his gardening knowledge, learned at the family home, Dawes is assigned to create and maintain a garden around the commandant's house.

Dawes is transferred to Port Arthur under Frere's command. As punishment for being involved in an attempt to escape, he is sent into solitary confinement on Grummet rock, a small island off the coast. Dawes manages to escape and is washed up on a beach, where he finds Frere, Mrs Vickers and Sylvia, who have been marooned there by escaped convicts. Dawes plans, and succeeds in building, a boat out of saplings and goat hide.  Frere promises Dawes a pardon if they are saved. Sylvia calls him, "Good Mr. Dawes". They take to sea and are rescued by an American vessel, but Frere has Dawes arrested. Sylvia has blocked out all memory of the events and cannot defend Dawes. Mrs. Vickers dies.

Sylvia, now a young woman of sixteen, marries Frere, who has lied about the events and painted Dawes as a would-be murderer.

Dawes escapes again to see Sylvia, but in her amnesia she is afraid of him. John Rex, another convict, tries to persuade Dawes to join him in an escape. Rex reaches Sydney and travels on to London with Sarah, now his wife, where he presents himself as Richard Devine. Lady Ellinor Devine, Richard's mother, accepts him as her long-lost son.

In Norfolk Island, by 1846, Reverend James North has been appointed prison chaplain. He is appalled at the horrible punishments inflicted. and also has strong feelings for Sylvia.

John Rex leads a life of debauchery, much to the disapproval of Lady Ellinor, and wishes to sell off the family estate. Lady Ellinor's suspicions have reached the point where she attempts to test her alleged son's knowledge of family secrets.

North visits Dawes in prison where he has been sentenced to death by Frere; he changes places with him and Dawes takes ship to Sydney without being discovered. He makes his way to the gold diggings at Ballarat, opening a general goods store. But Frere, now posted to Melbourne, tracks him down with the aid of a lawyer. The lawyer proves to be ‘Blinker’ now well educated, and Frere is shot dead.

Dawes travels to his home and is accepted by his Mother. Rex and his wife, now exposed as frauds, vanish into the night. Vickers arrives and hands Dawes a pardon, having personally lobbied on his behalf. It is assumed that Dawes and Sylvia will now marry.

Cast
 Colin Friels as Rufus Dawes
 Rod Mullinar as Lieutenant Frere
 Robert Coleby as John Rex
Susan Lyons as Sarah Purfoy
Penelope Stewart as Sylvia Vickers—As An Adult 
 Anthony Perkins as Reverend North
 Patrick Macnee as Major Vickers
 Samantha Eggar as Julie Vickers
 Diane Cilento as Lady Ellinor
Donald McDonald as Reverend Meekin
Johnny Johnstone as Gabbett
John Turnbull as Jemmy Vetch
Rebe Taylor as Sylvia Vickers—As A Child

Production
The mini-series was based on the original serialised version of the novel For the Term of His Natural Life, which meant it featured scenes of Rufus Dawes in the Australian Gold Rush and a happy ending where Dawes is reunited with Sylvia.

The mini series was a passion project for Patricia Payne, who had wanted to adapt the novel since she read it in high school. She spent eight years raising the $6.5 million budget, which consisted of private investment. Payne's co producer was Wilton Schiller, an American with extensive TV experience. Shooting began before the series had been sold to an Australian network.

It was shot partly in Adelaide, Victor Harbor, Macquarie Harbour and Port Arthur.

An interactive app based on the mini series was released in 2012.

Release
It was a ratings success. It was the eleventh highest rated Australian mini series on Sydney television between 1978 and 2000, with a rating of 37. It was the third highest on Melbourne television during that period with a rating of 45.

It aired in the United Kingdom in 1985, where the Guardian headlined its review "fair stinkum".

References

External links

For the Term of His Natural Life at AustLit
Full credits at the mini-series website
For the Term of His Natural Life at National Film and Sound Archive
For the Term of His Natural Life at TCMDB

1980s Australian television miniseries
Television shows set in colonial Australia
1983 Australian television series debuts
1983 Australian television series endings
Television shows based on Australian novels
Fiction set in 1846
Television series set in the 1840s
For the Term of His Natural Life